Richard Kissi Boateng (born 25 November 1988) is a Ghanaian professional footballer who currently plays as a left-back for Berekum Chelsea.

Club career
Boateng began his youth career with Saint Stars FC, before later transferring to Liberty Professionals FC in 2004, where he began his senior and professional career. In 2008, he was nominated as Defender of the year in Ghana. In July 2010, he moved to the Libyan side Al-Ittihad, and returned to Ghana for Berekum Chelsea in September 2011. On 16 January 2013, Boateng signed for Congolese club TP Mazembe on a five-year deal.

In January 2020, Boateng returned to Berekum Chelsea.

International career
On 16 May 2012, Boateng was called up to the Ghana squad for two, 2014 FIFA World Cup qualification matches against Lesotho national football team and Zambia national football team.

Personal life
Boating married in 2014. He and his wife welcomed a son in 2017.

Career statistics

International

Honours

Club 
TP Mazembe

 DR Congo Championship : 2013, 2013–14, 2015–16
 DR Congo Super Cup : 2013, 2014, 2016
 CAF Champions League : 2015
 Confederation Cup : 2016, 2017, runner up: 2013
 CAF Super Cup : 2016

SuperSport United

 MTN 8: 2017

References

External links
 Player profile
 

1988 births
Living people
Ghanaian footballers
Association football fullbacks
Liberty Professionals F.C. players
Al-Ittihad Club (Tripoli) players
Berekum Chelsea F.C. players
TP Mazembe players
SuperSport United F.C. players
Ghana Premier League players
South African Premier Division players
Ghanaian expatriate footballers
2013 Africa Cup of Nations players
Footballers from Kumasi
Expatriate footballers in Libya
Expatriate footballers in the Democratic Republic of the Congo
Expatriate soccer players in South Africa
Ghanaian expatriate sportspeople in Libya
Ghanaian expatriate sportspeople in the Democratic Republic of the Congo
Ghanaian expatriate sportspeople in South Africa
Ghana international footballers
Libyan Premier League players